Paracoeria is a genus of moths of the family Erebidae. The genus was erected by George Hampson in 1926.

Species
Paracoeria atridisca Hampson, 1926 Brazil (Rio de Janeiro)
Paracoeria orobena (H. Druce, 1891) Panama

References

Calpinae